Naked as We Came is a 2012 American drama film directed by Richard LeMay and starring Benjamin Weaver, Karmine Alers, Lue McWilliams, and Ryan Vigilant.

Cast 
 Benjamin Weaver as Ted 
 Karmine Alers as Laura
 Lue McWilliams as Lilly 
 Ryan Vigilant as Elliot
 Sturgis Adams as Jeff
 John Challice as Eric

Awards and nominations 
 2012, Won Audience Award" for 'Best Feature' at Cinema Diverse
 2012, Won Audience Award for 'Best Overall Feature' at Long Island Gay and Lesbian Film Festival

References

External links 

2012 drama films
American LGBT-related films
Gay-related films
LGBT-related drama films
2012 LGBT-related films
2012 films
2010s English-language films
2010s American films